The Houston Kid is the 10th album by American country music singer Rodney Crowell. It was released through Sugar Hill in 2001. The album includes the single "I Walk the Line Revisited", recorded in collaboration with Johnny Cash, which peaked at number 61 on the Hot Country Songs charts in late 1998.

Thom Jurek of AllMusic rated the album with a full five-star rating.

Track listing
All songs written by Rodney Crowell except where noted.
"Telephone Road" – 3:52
"The Rock Of My Soul" – 4:50
"Why Don't We Talk About It" – 3:35
"I Wish It Would Rain" – 3:28
"Wandering Boy" – 5:57
"I Walk The Line (Revisited)" (featuring Johnny Cash) (Crowell, Johnny Cash) – 3:51
"Highway 17" – 4:54
"U Don't Know How Much I Hate U" (Crowell, Steve Lukather) – 3:37
"Banks Of The Old Bandera" – 3:41
"Topsy Turvy" – 3:47
"I Know Love Is All I Need" – 5:20

Personnel

 Pat Buchanan - acoustic guitar, electric guitar, vocals
 Johnny Cash - Vocals
 Peter Coleman - Producer, Engineer, Mixing
 Steve Conn - Organ
 John Cowan - Vocals
 Donivan Cowart - Engineer
 Chad Cromwell - Drums
 Rodney Crowell - acoustic guitar, electric guitar, percussion, vocals
 Jim Dineen - Engineer
 Kenny Greenberg - electric guitar
 John Hobbs - Organ, Keyboards, Sampling
 John Jorgenson - electric guitar
 Tim Lauer - Keyboards
 Hunter Lee - Pipe
 Dan Leffler - Engineer, Second Engineer
 Paul Leim - Percussion, Drums
 Charlie McCoy - Harmonica
 Greg Morrow - Drums
 Michael Rhodes - Bass
 Vince Santoro - Vocals
 Steuart Smith - Harmonica, Mandolin, Autoharp, electric guitar, Harmonium, Producer
 Benmont Tench - piano
 David Thoener - Mixing
 Robby Turner - Dobro, steel guitar
 Kenny Vaughan - Flamenco Guitar
 Ian Wallace - Drums
 Produced by Peter Coleman

Chart performance

References

External links

Rodney Crowell albums
2001 albums
Sugar Hill Records albums